Resmetirom is an experimental drug for the treatment of non-alcoholic steatohepatitis (NASH). It is a selective agonist of thyroid hormone receptor-β which increases hepatic fat metabolism and reduces lipotoxicity.

As of 2023, it is in Phase III clinical trials.

References 

Experimental drugs
Nitriles
Chloroarenes
Isopropyl compounds
Pyridazines
Triazines